The Japanese common toad, Japanese warty toad or Japanese toad (Bufo japonicus) is a species of toad in the family Bufonidae. It is endemic to Japan. Its natural habitats are subarctic forests, temperate forests, temperate shrubland, swamps, freshwater marshes, intermittent freshwater marshes, freshwater springs, arable land, rural gardens, urban areas, ponds, and irrigated land. Amplexus is the mating behaviour involved in the Japanese common toad during the breeding season.

Description
The head has a pointed snout and is roughly triangular. The tympanum is elliptical and about as far behind the eye as its longest diameter. The body is robust and the stout forelimbs are about half as long as the hind limbs. The second finger on the hand is the shortest and the third the longest. On the hind foot, the first toe is the shortest and the fourth the longest. There is little webbing between the toes. The skin has small warty outgrowths and its colouring is variable, being greenish-brown, yellowish-brown or darker brown. It is often paler and smoother in the breeding season.

Distribution
The Japanese common toad is native to Japan and is present on the islands of Honshu, Hokkaido, Kyushu and Shikoku and the subspecies Bufo japonicus formosus has been introduced to the island of Izu Ōshima and Hokkaido. It is present in a wide variety of types of habitats including in lowland and mountainous areas.

Biology
 
The Japanese common toad lives mainly on land, feeding on earthworms and small arthropods including ants and some species of beetle that are lamentable to other predators. Breeding takes place in the spring when the toads congregate in shallow water bodies and long strings of eggs are laid and become tangled in underwater plants.

Reproduction 
The Japanese common toad is known for their intense male-male competition hence the type of breeding associated to this species is explosive breeding. The mating pattern of these toads is not conclusive but the major one is polyandry through amplexus.  Preceding mating is courtship which is based on tactile and visual senses.  The release of sperms from males is a result of the luteinizing hormone increasing in production and this whole process is induced by amplexus as the males clasp to the females.The size of the males is actually vital in deciding which competitor pairs with the female. The bigger males can always replace the smaller ones especially because amplexus is involved and the eggs need to be fertilized to suit the female's preferences. This is known as size-assortative mating which leads to male-biased operational sex ratio and in turn highly affects the male-male competition. Population density and operarional sex ratio are the two factors that contribute to how the males will compete for mating female partners. If the population of males in a specific breeding area is high, females are left with no other options but to practice polyandry.

Migration to breeding ponds is important in Bufos japonicus and this process is tracked by the production levels of the oscillatory potential changes (OSC). OSC levels are highest during the breeding month when the toads have reached their breeding destinations.  Other hormones like luteinizing hormone and follicle-stimulating hormone also spiral up when the species reach the breeding site.  In conclusion, the four processes that take place during the breeding season are emerging from hibernation, migration, amplexing, and ovulation in females or spermiation in males.

Status
The Japanese common toad has a wide range and is tolerant of many different types of habitats including man-made ones. It is presumed to have a large total population and no significant decline in numbers has been observed so the International Union for Conservation of Nature has assessed its conservation status as being of "least concern".

See also
European toad

References

Bufo
Endemic amphibians of Japan
Amphibians described in 1838
Articles containing video clips
Taxonomy articles created by Polbot